Provisional Polish Revolutionary Committee (Polrewkom) (July–August 1920) was a revolutionary committee created under the patronage of Soviet Russia with the goal to establish a Soviet republic within Poland, or a Polish Soviet Socialist Republic constituent in the Union of Soviet Socialist Republics.

History
Polrevkom was created on 23 July 1920, in Moscow by the Polish Bureau of Bolsheviks, with chairman Julian Marchlewski. The decision was made during the initial successes of the Red Army during the Polish-Soviet War with the goal of providing administration of the Polish territories. The committee was declared "provisional", because it was assumed that after a Soviet victory the power would be transferred to the Polish Communist Workers' Party.

The Polrevkom was assembled on 24 July in Smolensk, with its headquarters in an armored train, which quickly proceeded to Minsk (25 July), Wilno (27 July), and arrived to Białystok on 30 July 1920. It set up permanent headquarters in the Branicki Palace and issued public proclamations. For their efforts they received from Moscow over 2 billion rubles. It is seen, like many other Bolshevik revolutionary committees, as a Bolshevik puppet government.

The committee consisted of the following members:
 Julian Baltazar Marchlewski (Chairman)
 Feliks Dzierżyński (de facto leader)
 Feliks Kon (Education)
 Edward Próchniak (Secretary)
 Józef Unszlicht (Party)
 Bernard Zaks (Industry)
 Stanisław Bobiński (Agriculture)
 Tadeusz Radwański (Propaganda)

The Polrevkom activity was related to the North-Western Front of the Red Army. The South-Western front of the Red Army supported a similar Galician Revolutionary Committee (Galrevkom), seated in Tarnopol in Eastern Galicia.

The TKRP was met with relative enthusiasm in Białystok which had about 75% Jewish and working class majority. However, as the Red Army moved on towards Warsaw, it and Polrewkom had little support from the Polish population.

On 22 August 1920 the Polrevkom moved out of Białystok to Minsk with the defeat of the Red Army, and was dissolved soon afterwards. A significant number of the key persons involved were later instrumental in creation of the Polish Autonomous District within the Soviet Union.

Notes

References
 Davies, Norman, White Eagle, Red Star: the Polish-Soviet War, 1919-20, Pimlico, 2003, . (First edition: St. Martin's Press, inc., New York,  1972)
 

Polish–Soviet War
Polish
Poland–Soviet Union relations
Provisional governments
Polish
Polish
Communism in Poland
Polish